Vivir a Destiempo (literally: Living Untimely; official release: Timeless Love) is a Mexican telenovela produced by Fides Velasco and Jacky Castro for Azteca. It stars Edith González and Ramiro Fumazoni as the protagonists alongside Humberto Zurita, Andrea Noli and Wendy de los Cobos as the main villains. The original story and screenplay is written by Eric Vonn. From February 25 to September 20, 2013, Azteca 13 broadcast Vivir a Destiempo, replacing Los Rey.

Episodes

References

Lists of Mexican television series episodes